Zalutumumab (proposed trade name HuMax-EGFR) is a fully human IgG1 monoclonal antibody (mAb) directed towards the epidermal growth factor receptor (EGFR).  It is a product developed by Genmab in Utrecht, the Netherlands. Specifically, zalutumumab is designed for the treatment of squamous cell carcinoma of the head and neck (SCCHN), a type of cancer.

Mechanism of action 
Zalutumumab works through inhibition of the EGFR signal.  The EGFR is a receptor tyrosine kinase. Its structure includes an extracellular binding domain, a transmembrane lipophilic segment, and an intracellular tyrosine kinase domain.

Mechanism of EGFR 
EGFR is over-expressed by many tumor cells. Upon binding by a ligand, such as the epidermal growth factor or TGF alpha, dimerization occurs, leading to autophosphorylation on the intracellular tyrosine residues.  Following phosphorylation, the Grb2-SOS signaling complex is stimulated.  This causes the activation of the G protein RAS through the exchange of guanosine diphosphate (GDP) for guanosine triphosphate (GTP).  The exchange of GDP for GTP induces a conformational change of RAS to allow it to bind to Raf-1.  Raf-1 is then activated through another multistep mechanism in which dephosphorylation of inhibitory sites by protein phosphatase 2A (PP2A), as well as the phosphorylation of activating sites by p21 activated kinase (PAK) occurs.  After this, Raf-1 activates MAPK/ERK kinase (MEK), which then goes on to activate extracellular-signal-regulated kinase (ERK).  ERK is then able to enter the cell nucleus and control gene expression by phosphorylating various transcription factors, such as Elk-1. It is from there that the specific gene transcription occurs to initiate the cell cycle. Through this mechanism, apoptosis is inhibited, angiogenesis, migration, adhesion, and invasion occur.  Each of these is a functional element to the progression and development of cancer, which is defined as an abnormal growth of cells with a tendency to proliferate in an uncontrolled way and, in some cases, to metastasize.

Mechanism of zalutumumab 
In order to combat SCCHN, zalutumumab was designed to inhibit the EGFR signaling.  Specifically, it binds to the EGFR Domain III on the cell surface.  This locks the receptor in an inactive conformation, making the drug an inverse agonist. In doing this it is also acting as a competitive antagonist for the EGF ligand. In the inactive conformation, the distance between the intracellular tyrosine kinase residues is larger, which inhibits dimerization. Phosphorylation is consequently inhibited, so that no signal is released.  Without a signal, cell cycle characteristics to enhance tumor growth are inhibited and the cancer progression is suppressed.

This is not the only way in which zalutumumab works. It also is responsible for some antitumor affects through antibody-dependent cellular cytotoxicity (ADCC). The Fab, or fragment antigen binding region of the antibody, binds to the antigen on the EGFr expressing tumor cells. Through an immunological response, the body’s natural killer (NK) cells, which are a type of lymphocyte, recognize and bind to the Fc portion on the antibody through an Fc receptor, CD16. The NK cell is then activated through the cross linking of the Fc receptors which sends a signal to induce apoptosis and cell death. The target tumor cell is then destroyed.

Developmental status 
2009: Zalutumumab treatment was approved for Fast Track status by the U.S. Food and Drug Administration for patients suffering from SCCHN who have failed standard therapies and have no other options.  The drug has undergone pre-clinical and Phase I and II studies and is also in Phases I and II for SCCHN front-line with chemo-radiation and SCCHN with radiation.  Additionally, a Phase II is under way for SCCHN and Phase III studies are also being performed for SCCHN and SCCHN front-line with radio therapy. 

2010:A phase III study (of zalutumumab as an addition to 'best supportive care' in patients after failed standard platinum-based chemotherapy) reported a non-significant improvement in overall survival, and a significant 61% improvement in Progression-free survival

2014:A study of zalutumumab as addition to chemoradiation for SCCHN showed no benefit, and 94% developed a skin rash (11% severe enough to discontinue).

2015:Genmab not proceeding with zalutumumab.

References 

Monoclonal antibodies for tumors
Abandoned drugs